Dinur is a Hebrew language surname. Notable people with the surname include:

Ben-Zion Dinur (1883-1973), Zionist activist, educator, historian, and Israeli politician
Yehiel Dinur (1909–2001), Jewish writer
Irit Dinur, Israeli mathematician

Hebrew-language surnames